Louis Carl Pessolano (February 23, 1907 – February 1983) was a professional football player who played in one game with the Staten Island Stapletons of the National Football League in 1929.

Prior to playing professionally, Pessolano played college football at Villanova.

References

1907 births
1983 deaths
Players of American football from Pennsylvania
Staten Island Stapletons players
Villanova Wildcats football players
People from New Kensington, Pennsylvania